Andrew Jackson Hinshaw (August 4, 1923 – January 21, 2016) was an American politician who served as a Congressman for California between 1973 and 1977. In 1977 he was convicted of accepting bribes from the Tandy Corporation in his previous job as Orange County, California, assessor.

Biography
Hinshaw was born in Dexter, Missouri, and attended public schools in Michigan and Los Angeles, California. He was in the Navy in World War II from 1942 to 1945. He received a B.S. degree from the University of Southern California in 1950 and attended the USC Law School.

Political career
Hinshaw worked for 10 years for the California State Board of Equalization and five years for the Los Angeles County Assessor's Office. He entered politics as the Property Assessor of Orange County, California, serving from 1965 to 1972. This had been a controversial office and there had been calls from Orange County grand juries to change the extremely lenient treatment given to large landowners.

In 1972 Hinshaw entered the Republican primary for California's 39th Congressional District in the United States House of Representatives. The district, which had been the 35th District prior to redistricting, was represented by outspoken conservative John G. Schmitz. Hinshaw, considered a moderate Republican by Orange County standards, was personally recruited by President Richard Nixon, whose home in San Clemente was in the district after Schmitz suggested that Nixon should not have returned from his 1972 visit to China.

Hinshaw scored a considerable upset in the Republican primary election, narrowly defeating Schmitz by 2.7 percentage points. This was tantamount to election in what has long been considered the most Republican district in California. Hinshaw was reelected in 1974 but was defeated in the 1976 primary by State Assemblyman Robert Badham, who won the general election.

Arrest and conviction
In 1976 Hinshaw was accused of twelve counts of accepting bribes from the Tandy Corporation while he had been Assessor of Orange County as well as using county employees, staff and supplies for his 1972 Campaign for Congress. He was found guilty and sentenced to one to fourteen years in prison, serving eight months.

Death
Hinshaw died on January 21, 2016, at the age of 92.

See also
List of federal political scandals in the United States

References

|-

1923 births
2016 deaths
California politicians convicted of crimes
Republican Party members of the United States House of Representatives from California
People from Dexter, Missouri
People from Mission Viejo, California
People from Orange County, California
United States Navy personnel of World War II
University of Southern California alumni
USC Gould School of Law alumni